União Desportiva de Santarém is a Portuguese football club based in Santarém in central Portugal. They play in the 3rd nacional division.

The club was founded in 1969 and plays at the 5,000 capacity Campo Chã das Padeiras stadium. The club has participated in the Portuguese Second Division in the past, but has spent most of its history in the lower levels of Portuguese football.

External links
Fan page on Facebook

Football clubs in Portugal
Association football clubs established in 1969
1969 establishments in Portugal
Santarém, Portugal